Yun may refer to:

Yǔn,  Chinese name of Xionites, a nomadic tribe of Central Asia
Yun (Chinese name) (云/雲), a Chinese family name
Yun (ancient surname), an ancient Chinese surname
Yeon, or Yun, Korean (or Dutch given name) family name
Yun (Korean surname), or Yoon, Korean family name
Yun (Street Fighter), a Street Fighter character
Yun OS, mobile operation system developed by Alibaba
Yun County, Hubei, in China
Yun County, Yunnan, in China
Yunnan, abbreviated as Yún, province of China
Brother Yun, a Chinese Christian
Arduino Yún, a single-board microcontroller
ISO 4217 for Yugoslav Convertible dinar